The Four Profound Weaves is an acclaimed 2020 LGBT+ fantasy novella by R.B. Lemberg. In 2021, it has been nominated in the best novella category for the Ignyte, Nebula, World Fantasy, and Locus awards.

Plot

A nameless man returns to the desert settlement of his old friend Uiziya in the hopes that she can give him a name and identity. He has transitioned from female to male and is struggling with his place in his strictly gender-segregated tribe. Uiziya is a weaver awaiting the return of her aunt Benesret, who has promised to teach her the art of magical weaving and the Four Profound Weaves. The two journey into the desert to search for Benesret. Uiziya is injured by both an assassin and Benesret, and the nameless man takes her to his home city of Iyar. They attract the attention of The Collector, who kidnaps Uiziya so she can weave from Death for him. The two defeat The Collector. The nameless man claims a new name, Kaveh-nen-Kimri; he and Uiziya promise to explore the desert further together.

Major themes

The novella discusses the relationship between transgender identity and death. Uiziya learns to weave cloth from Death itself, and the nameless man learns that he is "dead inside" throughout his journey. Some transgender people feel that their pre-transition lives are a type of "waking death", and transgender people are victims of murder at higher rates than cisgender people. The story also discusses the intersectionality between discrimination based on gender identity and age.

Background

Lemberg has published short stories and poems in the Birdverse before, most frequently in the literary magazine Beneath Ceaseless Skies. The Four Profound Weaves is their first full-length work set in this shared universe.

Reception

The novella has received widespread praise from many critics and readers.

Reviews have praised the novella for its lyrical writing, and inclusion of two elderly transgender narrators in an accurate discussion of aging. A review from Locus praised the succinct prose and worldbuilding, calling it "one of the most beautifully written fantasies of the year". In a starred review, Publishers Weekly called it an "outstanding debut novel" and praised its "deeply considered, evocative" characterization. New York Journal of Books called it "a beautifully articulated exploration of queer identity and transformation" and called Lemberg's prose "rhythmic and haunting". Ms. Magazine called it "a wonder of identity, evolution and bravery in a time when we need it most".

Awards and nominations

The Four Profound Weaves was nominated for the 2021 Ignyte Award for Best Novella, the 2021 Nebula Award for Best Novella, the 2021 World Fantasy Award for Best Novella, and the 2021 Locus Award for Best Novella.

References

External links
 The Four Profound Weaves Embraces the Magic of Trans Elders, S.E. Fleenor, SyFy Wire
 The Four Profound Weaves by R. B. Lemberg, Publishers Weekly
 Gary K. Wolfe Reviews The Four Profound Weaves by R. B. Lemberg, Gary K. Wolfe, Locus
 The Four Profound Weaves: A Birdverse Book, Anna Burke, New York Journal of Books

2020 fantasy novels
LGBT speculative fiction novels
Novels with transgender themes
2020s LGBT novels
Tachyon Publications books